Cymonympha is a genus of moths of the family Yponomeutidae. This genus only contains one species, that has a wingspan of 7mm:

Species
Cymonympha xantholeuca - Meyrick, 1927  (from Samoa)

References

Yponomeutidae